Élisabeth Depardieu (née Élisabeth Dominique Lucie Guignot; born 5 August 1941) is a French actress, writer, co-producer, ex-wife of actor Gérard Depardieu and mother of actors Guillaume Depardieu  and Julie Depardieu.

Personal life

Élisabeth Dominique Lucie Guignot was born to a well-off Parisian family and married Gérard Depardieu on 19 February 1970. They had two children together, actors Guillaume Depardieu and Julie Depardieu. The couple divorced in 1996.

Career
Élisabeth appeared, as Elisabeth Guy, on TV and in movies. Later she appeared with Gérard Depardieu: Le tartuffe (1984), and later, while husband and wife they played husband and wife in Jean de Florette (1986). She participated at the 19th Brest European Short Film Festival in 2004 as a member of the jury.

She became Knight of the Legion of Honour in 2008.

Filmography

Notes

External links

1941 births
Living people
Actresses from Paris
Chevaliers of the Légion d'honneur
French film actresses
Elisabeth